Cindy McTee (born February 20, 1953) is an American composer and educator.

Early life and education
McTee was born in Tacoma, Washington. She studied at Pacific Lutheran University, the Academy of Music in Kraków, Yale University, and the University of Iowa. Her teachers included Krzysztof Penderecki, Bruce MacCombie, and Jacob Druckman.

Teaching experience

McTee taught at Pacific Lutheran University for three years before joining the faculty of the University of North Texas College of Music in 1984, where she received a promotion to Full Professor in 1995 and to Regents Professor in 2000. In 2009, she was designated a Fellow in UNT's Institute for the Advancement of the Arts. She also participated in leadership roles at UNT, most notably as Chair of the Division of Composition Studies for a total of five years ending in 2000. In 2010, she retired from the University of North Texas as Regents Professor Emeritus.

Major awards

McTee has received two awards from the American Academy of Arts and Letters (1992) (2002), a fellowship from the John Simon Guggenheim Memorial Foundation (2001), a Fulbright Fellowship (1990), and a composer fellowship from the National Endowment for the Arts (1994). She won the Louisville Orchestra Composition Competition (2001) and the Detroit Symphony Orchestra's third annual Elaine Lebenbom Memorial Award (2009). She also received a Music Alive Award from Meet the Composer (2002) and a BMI (Broadcast Music Incorporated) Student Composers Award (1977).

Personal life
McTee married the conductor Leonard Slatkin on 20 November 2011.

Performances

Amarillo Symphony
American Composers Orchestra
Aspen Festival Orchestra
Bands of America
Buffalo Philharmonic
Chicago Symphony Orchestra
Cleveland Orchestra
Colorado Symphony Orchestra
Columbus Symphony Orchestra
Dallas Symphony Orchestra
Dallas Wind Symphony
Detroit Symphony Orchestra
Flagstaff Symphony Orchestra
Houston Symphony Orchestra
Indianapolis Symphony Orchestra
Lone Star Wind Orchestra
Los Angeles Philharmonic
Nashville Symphony
National Symphony Orchestra
New World Symphony (orchestra)
NHK Symphony Orchestra
North Texas Wind Symphony
Omaha Symphony Orchestra
Orchestre National de Lyon
Pacific Symphony
Philharmonia Orchestra
Pittsburgh New Music Ensemble
Pittsburgh Symphony Orchestra
Puerto Rico Symphony Orchestra
Rochester Philharmonic Orchestra
Saint Louis Symphony Orchestra
San Antonio Symphony Orchestra
Seattle Symphony Orchestra
Springfield Symphony Orchestra
Sydney Symphony Orchestra
The United States Army Field Band
United States Marine Band
Voices of Change
Yale Concert Band

Major works
Double Play, for wind ensemble (2011)
Double Play, for orchestra (2010)
Tempus Fugit, for orchestra (2010)
The Unquestioned Answer, for orchestra (2009)
Bricolage, for flute and computer music on CD (2008)
Solstice, concerto for trombone and orchestra (2007)
Fanfare for Trombones (2007)
Finish Line, for wind symphony (2006)
Finish Line, for orchestra (2005)
Einstein's Dream, for string orchestra, percussion, and computer music on CD (2004)
Fanfare for Trumpets (2004)
Ballet for Band (2004)
Adagio, for string quartet (2003)
Adagio, for string orchestra (2002)
Symphony No. 1: Ballet for Orchestra (2002)
Timepiece, for wind symphony (2001)
Timepiece, for orchestra (2000)
Agnus Dei, for organ (1998)
Changes, for cello and bass (1996)
Soundings, for band (1995)
Stepping Out, for flute and percussion (1993)
Capriccio per Krzysztof Penderecki, for violin (1993)
California Counterpoint: The Twittering Machine, for wind ensemble (1993)
The Twittering Machine, for chamber orchestra (1993)
Circle Music V for trombone and tape (1992)
"M" Music, for computer music on CD (1992)
Circuits, for wind ensemble (1990)
Circuits, for orchestra (1990)
Metal Music, for computer music on CD (1989)
Circle Music I for viola and piano (1988)
Circle Music II for flute and piano (1988)
Circle Music III for bassoon and piano (1988)
Circle Music IV for horn and piano (1988)
Psalm 100, for choir (1982)
Chord, for flute (1977)

References

Further reading 
Alber, Brian: The Evolution of Melodic Construction in Three 20th-Century Wind Band Works. Journal of Band Research, 2007
Cummings, Robert: PAUL LANSKY, CHARLES DODGE, CINDY MCTEE, J. B. FLOYD, ALLEN STRANGE: THE COMPOSER IN THE COMPUTER AGE, III (CDCM COMPUTER MUSIC SERIES, VOL. 18), Computer Music Journal, Summer 1997, Vol. 21, Issue 2, p. 95
Fullmer, David: "Cindy McTee." A Composer's Insight: Thoughts, Analysis and Commentary on Contemporary Masterpieces for Wind Band. Meredith Music Publications, 2003, 
Fullmer, David: A Comparison of the Wind Band Writing of Three Contemporary Composers: Karel Husa, Timothy Broege, and Cindy McTee. University of Washington, 2002
Hinkle-Turner, Elizabeth: Crossing the Line: Women Composers and Music Technology in the United States. Ashgate, 2006, 
Hinkle-Turner, Elizabeth: The New Grove, 2nd ed., edited by Stanley Sadie (2001),   and 
Kilpatrick, Barry: FANFARE FOR TRUMPETS; CIRCUITS; SOUNDINGS; CALIFORNIA COUNTERPOINT; BALLET; FINISH LINE; TIMEPIECE American Record Guide,  May/Jun2008, Vol. 71 Issue 3, p149-149, 1/2p
Slayton, Michael: Women of Influence in Contemporary Music: Nine American Composers. Scarecrow Press, 2011, 
Weaver, Jennifer: Structural Octatonicism in Cindy McTee's Symphony No.1: Ballet for Orchestra. University of North Texas, 2007
Williams, Nicholas: Primary Stylistic Characteristics of Cindy's McTee's Music as Found in Timepiece, Ballet for Band, and Finish Line. University of North Texas, 2009.

External links 
cindymctee.com - Official Website
Bill Holab Music - Publisher
PlaybillArts - Feature Article: A Dream of Music and Technology
Society for American Music - Article: Gender and Music Composition: A Personal Perspective
American Music Center
Women Composers Yesterday, Today, and Tomorrow

1953 births
Living people
20th-century classical composers
20th-century American composers
20th-century women composers
20th-century American women musicians
21st-century classical composers
21st-century American composers
21st-century women composers
21st-century American women musicians
American classical composers
American women classical composers
American women in electronic music
American music educators
American women music educators
Electroacoustic music composers
Musicians from Tacoma, Washington
Musicians from Washington (state)
Pacific Lutheran University alumni
Texas classical music
University of Iowa alumni
University of North Texas College of Music faculty
Yale University alumni
Pupils of Jacob Druckman